William Donachie (born 5 October 1951) is a Scottish former professional footballer. Donachie had a long playing career, the majority of which was with Manchester City. He also played for Norwich City, Burnley, Oldham Athletic and Portland Timbers. Donachie played 35 times for Scotland and was selected in two FIFA World Cup squads (1974 and 1978). Towards the end of his playing career Donachie became a player-coach at Oldham, working with Joe Royle. Donachie has since worked for numerous teams in coaching roles.

Playing career
Donachie was born in Glasgow (originally from the Gorbals, he grew up in Castlemilk and attended King's Park Secondary School, but began his football career in England as a junior with Manchester City, turning professional in December 1968. He made his first team debut in February 1970 and replaced Glyn Pardoe at left-back in City's side and quickly established himself as a regular in the side. He won the 1972 FA Charity Shield, played in two League Cup finals for City and went on to make 347 appearances before leaving in 1979 to play for NASL side Portland Timbers. He returned to England in September 1981, joining Norwich City for a fee of £200,000, but rejoined Portland in March 1982. In November the same year he joined Burnley.

In April 1972, he made his full debut for Scotland against Peru at Hampden Park, having previously made two appearances for Scotland's Under-23 side. He went on to win 35 full caps for Scotland and played in the 1978 World Cup finals.

Coaching career
In July 1984, Donachie joined Oldham Athletic where he became player-assistant manager to Joe Royle. Under Royle and Donachie Oldham enjoyed considerable success at Boundary Park, taking the unfashionable minnows to the Premier League, League Cup Final and epic FA Cup semi-finals against Manchester United in the early 1990s.

When Royle left to manage Everton in 1995, Donachie followed as his assistant. Donachie then had a stint as first team coach at Sheffield United. Towards the end of the 1997–98 season he rejoined Royle at Manchester City. In May 2001, Royle was sacked, but Donachie opted to stay at Manchester City as first team coach under new manager Kevin Keegan. In November 2001 he left City to become assistant to Terry Yorath at Sheffield Wednesday. He resigned from his post at Hillsborough on 28 October 2002 to link up again with Joe Royle, who by now was manager of Ipswich Town. Ipswich paid Wednesday £50,000 compensation for this move.

Donachie left Portman Road in June 2006 after Jim Magilton was appointed as manager, this coming after Donachie had stated his interest in the job himself, and joined Millwall as assistant to Nigel Spackman. He was appointed manager of Millwall on 22 November 2006, after being caretaker manager following Spackman's sacking on 25 September 2006. Millwall had been in the relegation zone when Spackman left, but Donachie steadied the ship and Millwall finished the 2006–7 season in mid-table. On 19 March 2007, Donachie signed a two-year deal as manager. He was sacked by Millwall in October 2007, after a run of poor results left the club bottom of Football League One. He then took charge of the Antigua and Barbuda national team for a couple of games against Cuba in late 2008.

In December 2009, Donachie was appointed assistant director at Newcastle United's academy. In December 2010 he was promoted to development coach. On 6 February 2014, Donachie resigned after it was alleged that he had hit reserve player Remie Streete following a 2–0 defeat against Sunderland in an under-21s match.

In October 2014, Donachie was appointed assistant manager at Hartlepool United. On 6 December 2014 Donachie and manager Paul Murray were sacked by Hartlepool, following an FA Cup defeat to non-league Blyth Spartans. Donachie then became the head coach for Temecula FC in the National Premier Soccer League. Donachie joined Accrington Stanley in June 2017 as a youth technical coach.

In September 2018 Donachie was appointed as manager of the Montserrat national football team, ahead of the 2019–20 CONCACAF Nations League qualifying campaign, which doubled up as qualification for the 2019 CONCACAF Gold Cup. An impressive campaign saw Montserrat qualify for League B of the Nations League and just miss out on Gold Cup qualification. Donachie left the national team manager's role in June 2022.

Career statistics

International

Managerial record

External links
Career information at ex-canaries.co.uk

References

1951 births
Living people
Footballers from Glasgow
Scottish footballers
Scottish football managers
Scottish expatriate football managers
Scotland international footballers
1974 FIFA World Cup players
1978 FIFA World Cup players
Manchester City F.C. players
North American Soccer League (1968–1984) players
Portland Timbers (1975–1982) players
Norwich City F.C. players
Oldham Athletic A.F.C. players
Burnley F.C. players
Millwall F.C. managers
English Football League players
Expatriate soccer players in the United States
Association football fullbacks
Scotland under-23 international footballers
Sheffield United F.C. non-playing staff
Sheffield Wednesday F.C. non-playing staff
Manchester City F.C. non-playing staff
Antigua and Barbuda national football team managers
Expatriate football managers in Antigua and Barbuda
Scottish expatriate sportspeople in Antigua and Barbuda
Newcastle United F.C. non-playing staff
Hartlepool United F.C. non-playing staff
Accrington Stanley F.C. non-playing staff
English Football League managers
Montserrat national football team managers
Scottish expatriate sportspeople in the United States
Scottish expatriate footballers
People from Gorbals
People educated at Kings Park Secondary School